South Stack Cliffs RSPB reserve is a nature reserve, run by the RSPB, on Holy Island on the North West coast of Anglesey, Wales.  The reserve is on sea cliffs facing the islet of South Stack, and is crossed by the Anglesey Coastal Path. There is an information centre based in Elin's Tower in the reserve.

It is best known for its breeding seabirds, including puffins, razorbills, guillemots, kittiwakes and fulmars. peregrine falcons, common kestrels and choughs also nest on the cliffs.

The area is famous for its rare bird species, such as black lark and grey catbird and fascinating geology.

South Stack Cliffs RSPB reserve also helps to conserve the silver-studded blue butterfly Plebejus argus found on the reserve in Spring. The Spathulate fleawort, a subspecies of field fleawort, a small yellow flower, is only found here, in the whole world.

References

External links
RSPB South Stack Cliffs

South Stack Cliffs
Nature reserves in Anglesey
Trearddur